Under the Moonlight may refer to:

Music
 Under the Moonlight, an album by Ghost, 2002
 Under the Moonlight, an album by Timeless Miracle, unreleased
 Under the Moonlight, an EP by VAV, 2015
 "Under the Moonlight", a song by Dennis Wilson from Pacific Ocean Blue, 2008 reissue
 "Under the Moonlight", a song by Donna De Lory from Songs 95, 2002
 "Under the Moonlight", a song by Travis from The Boy with No Name, 2007

Other uses
 Under the Moonlight, a 2001 film by Reza Mirkarimi
 After War Gundam X: Under the Moonlight, a 2004–2006 manga sequel to the Japanese anime series After War Gundam X

See also
 Under the Moon, a 1990s UK sports show
 By the Light of the Moon (disambiguation)